Nyima (ཉི་མ་, Nima-xiang 尼玛乡)  is a township of Baingoin County,  Tibet Autonomous Region, People's Republic of China.

It has eight constituent villages: 吾前村, 杂空村, 达果村, 塞龙村, 下地村, 琼果村, 尼德村, 沙吉村.

References
2016 Statistical zoning codes and urban and rural codes: Nima Township (Bangor County). National Bureau of Statistics of the People's Republic of China.

Populated places in Nagqu
Township-level divisions of Tibet